Eric Lee Martin (born October 10, 1960, in Long Island, New York) is an American rock singer and musician who was active throughout the 1980s, 1990s, and 2000s, both as a solo artist and as a member of various bands.  He earned his most prominent success as the frontman for the hard rock band Mr. Big, which scored a big hit in the early 1990s with "To Be with You", a song that Martin wrote during his teen years.

A native of the San Francisco Bay Area, Martin first started his career in the music industry in 1978.

Early years
Eric is the son of Frederick Lee "Pepper" Martin and Iris Martin. He has three younger siblings Dan, Joan and Laurie; and is half-Irish, half-Italian.

Eric Martin was a drummer for a short while. Realizing it fit his personality better, he opted for front man/lead vocalist in the next bands he joined. He played in a handful of teen rock groups such as S.F. Bloodshy and Backhome while attending Foothill High School in Sacramento, California. He performed in a punk band in the mid-1970s called The Innocents with Connie Champagne and Ric Walz-Smith. Also in 1974 and 1975, he played college clubs with Jim Preston in The J.C. Michaels Band. He started to make it big when he joined Stark Raving Mad (which also included future Winger guitarist/keyboardist Paul Taylor) in Santa Rosa, California. Stark Raving Mad, which also included Donavan Stark and Brian Stark, cut a demo with Bearsville Records that was produced by Chris Nicks, brother of Stevie Nicks.

During the summer break in 1974, Martin joined a musical comedy workshop held at Mira Loma High School in Sacramento. He auditioned for the part of Judas; although he ultimately did not get the role, he did become the understudy. Martin credits the honing of his voice to his teacher, Judy Davis. She taught him diction, stamina, and breath-control.

The Martin family finally settled in the San Francisco Bay Area in about 1976. Martin attended Galileo High School and met up with some of the band members who would join him in his first successful venture: Kid Courage. Kid Courage opened for AC/DC for two shows in the Bay Area, which were AC/DC's first shows in America.

Martin was invited to audition for various iconic bands in the 1970s and 1980s, namely, Van Halen, Toto, and Rainbow. He received a call directly from Eddie Van Halen in 1985 who told him he "liked his voice" and wanted to meet the following week. Martin flew to Los Angeles to audition, and on arriving at the Airport he met Sammy Hagar who told Martin that he had already got the job, so Martin decided not to go to the audition with Van Halen.

Musical influences
Martin grew up listening to both soul and rock icons in the 1970s, such as Otis Redding, Paul Rodgers, The Beatles, The Rolling Stones, Lynyrd Skynyrd, Edgar Winter, Free, and Humble Pie. When he was about 13 to 15 years old, while living in Italy, he was introduced musically to different artists under Motown Records and Stax/Volt Records.

He often collaborates and performs with fellow songwriter and friend Andre Pessis.

Music career

415 / Eric Martin Band, 1978–1985
Martin had decided to live independently by the age of 18. His first job was selling ice-cream. The big break he needed came when John Nymann, guitarist for the band Mile Hi, gave him a call and asked if he would want to form a new band together. The two had known each other since their former bands (Mile Hi and Kid Courage) had played together at the Mabuhay Gardens on Broadway in San Francisco. In agreement, Nymann and Martin got people together from both their previous bands, and formed a new group named 415 – which was the telephone area code for the San Francisco Bay Area, since every person in the band was from there.

415 was formed in late 1979. It marked the start of Martin's career as lead vocalist. He stated, "415 played hundreds of shows at area nightclubs, beer parties, even high school and college dances, before eventually headlining San Francisco's premiere night club – the Old Waldorf. Selling out in advance, word quickly spread about our dynamic live shows and soon we were opening for established acts like Billy Squier, Hall & Oates, Rick Springfield, Molly Hatchet, the Marshall Tucker Band, and Foreigner, to name a few. Eventually, without yet being signed to a recording contract, we played in front of 60,000 fans at Oakland Stadium at Bill Graham's Days on the Green Concert." The band became a popular local draw, all the while still being an unsigned act.

415 was later signed on to Elektra/Asylum Records under the management of Walter "Herbie" Herbert, Ron Chiarottino, and Sandy Einstein. These three persons managed and worked for the band Journey. The management decided to change the name of the band to the Eric Martin Band (EMB), as singer-named bands were popular during that time. EMB debuted their first album in 1983, entitled Sucker for a Pretty Face. The LP received a gold disc (certification?), and consequently led to the band's appearance on American Bandstand and in various arena tours as the opening act for ZZ Top, Night Ranger, and Journey. In one interview, Eric mentions that they "worked thousands of shows, from clubs, to frat house parties, Bill Graham concerts, opening for anybody and everybody." One of the most acclaimed performances of the band was a solo tour in 1983 held at Honolulu, Hawaii. But despite continuing to land high-profile gigs as support for some of the most popular acts at the time, the band decided to split up in 1985 after returning from the ZZ Top tour.

Solo career after Eric Martin Band, 1985–1988
After the break-up, Martin continued involving himself in several recordings and gigs. He contributed to the track "I Can't Stop the Fire" from the movie soundtrack Teachers, as well as "These Are the Good Times" and "Eyes of the World" from the movie Iron Eagle. In 1985, Eric Martin released a self-titled album Eric Martin, featuring the minor hit "The Information" which peaked at No. 87 mid-year. It was followed later on in 1987 by I'm Only Fooling Myself, which was re-issued in 2008 by Rock Candy Records. The album is a compilation of songs written by such people as Myles Hunter, John Waite, and a whole host of other established songwriters. It also included top West Coast session musicians such as drummers Mike Baird (who worked with Rick Springfield and Journey) and Mickey Curry (with Bryan Adams and Hall and Oates), guitarists Richie Zito, Tim Pierce, Michael Landau, and Rick Nowells. A compilation of the two solo albums are available on Soul Sessions – The Capitol Years CD.

Mr. Big, 1988–2002; 2009–present
In 1988, Martin teamed up with Billy Sheehan, Pat Torpey, and Paul Gilbert to form Los Angeles supergroup Mr. Big.  The band combined "shredding" musicianship with melodic vocal harmonies. The reputations of the players generated immediate interest in fellow musicians, and the band was signed to Atlantic Records in 1989.  That year, the band released their eponymous debut, which received critical and commercial success in the US and Japan. In June 1990, the group toured America with the Canadian band Rush.

The group's 1991 release, Lean into It, featured two ballads that established them as a commercial success: "To Be with You" (number one song in 15 countries) and "Just Take My Heart". The album was followed by a British tour in April and May of the same year, supported by bands The Throbs and Heartland.

After another British tour, the band released the Mr. Big Live album in 1992.  Mr. Big continued work on a third album as they headlined shows across the U.K. in 1993.  In December, the band notably broke away from this run to play as support act for Aerosmith's three-night, sold-out stand at London's Wembley Arena.

In 1993, another ballad from Mr. Big's new album Bump Ahead rose to the top 10 of the charts – a cover of Cat Stevens' "Wild World". Although the band was unable to sustain commercial success in the US, their popularity in Japan continued to soar, leading to several Japan-only live albums as Raw Like Sushi I, Raw Like Sushi II, Japandemonium, and Mr. Big in Japan In 1996, Mr. Big released Hey Man, which sold strongly in the Far East. In 1997, the band released the album Live At Budokan before taking a break from recording and touring.

While recording their fifth studio album, Paul Gilbert announced his decision to leave the band, and new guitarist Richie Kotzen was added to the lineup. The new line-up of Mr. Big released Get Over It in September 1999 in Japan. Get Over It yielded "Superfantastic", a number one hit in Japan that went multi-platinum. It proved to be Atlantic's biggest selling release in that territory. Mr. Big put in a 20-date tour of Japan followed by a rousing New Year's Eve 1999 show with Aerosmith at the Osaka Dome in Osaka. Get Over It was released in the U.S. on March 21, 2000, followed by a short club stint at The Roxy Theater in West Hollywood.

In the summer of 2001, Martin and the rest of Mr. Big released Actual Size in Japan and the rest of Asia. The CD stayed on the charts in the number three spot and "Shine" the first single off the album was number one. The song was also used as the ending theme for the animation series, Hellsing. Though headed for a breakup, the members of Mr. Big performed a farewell tour of Japan and Asia in 2002 as part of a contract they were obliged to comply with.

A near Mr. Big "one-off" reunion took place on May 13, 2008, in Los Angeles, at the House of Blues, when Paul Gilbert was joined onstage by Pat Torpey, Richie Kotzen and Billy Sheehan for renditions of Humble Pie's "30 Days in the Hole" and original Mr. Big composition "Daddy, Brother, Lover, Little Boy". Reportedly, the three had such an amazing time that they decided to contact Eric Martin a few days later, and a reunion of the four original members (Paul, Eric, Pat, and Billy) was put into motion.

The reunion was first officially announced on February 1, 2009, in a Japanese radio program called "Heavy Metal Syndicate by Koh Sakai". The interviews and press conferences that followed shortly within the first two weeks of February revealed plans of the band to tour Japan in June 2009 and to release new albums. A world tour followed suit, with dates all across Europe, and several gigs in South East Asia, particularly in India, Thailand, Philippines, Singapore, Indonesia, and South Korea.

In 2010, Mr. Big recorded a new album titled What If... produced by Kevin Shirley and released in early 2011.

On May 10, 2011, after almost two decades, Mr. Big played the Araneta Coliseum in Manila, the Philippines. The band performed most of the songs from "Lean into It", and also introduced new songs from What If.... The band embarked on a very successful South American tour that ended with two dates in Brazil, at the last of which in the city of Porto Alegre on July 10, according to Eric Martin, Mr. Big had an "end of the tour party" live in front of over 2,000 fans at the local rock venue Bar Opinião.

In October 2014, Mr. Big released ...The Stories We Could Tell with 13 new songs and a bonus live track of "Addicted to That Rush."  They embarked on a world tour to support the record and an unofficial fifth member of the band joined them on the tour:  drummer Matt Starr.  Starr (most notably from Ace Frehley's band,) is a talented drummer and singer, and Mr. Big recruited him to sit in for Pat Torpey, who had recently been diagnosed with Parkinson's disease. While Torpey did tour with the band, he played drums on only a few songs, and typically sat on a stool and sang with the band while Starr handled the rest of the drum duties.  Additional dates are planned for rock cruises and West coast dates in early 2016. On July 7, 2017, Mr. Big released Defying Gravity, its ninth studio album.  The record was recorded in a matter of six days to accommodate the schedules of the band members and the producer, and was released on the Frontiers Music SRL label. It featured 11 new songs and was produced by Kevin Elson, who also produced Mr. Big's debut record in 1989.  They embarked on a tour of the United States, followed by tours of Europe and southeast Asia, including a return to the Philippines on October 12, 2017.

On February 7, 2018, drummer Pat Torpey died from complications of Parkinson's disease at the age of 64. His last show was at the Wulfrun Hall in Wolverhampton on 23 November 2017. A memorial show took place on 23 May 2018 at The Canyon in Agoura Hills, California, with former member Richie Kotzen as a special guest. The all-star finale of "To Be With You" included, among others, Matt Sorum, Dave Amato, Ricky Phillips, Keith St John, Prescott Niles, Kelly Keagy, Jeff Scott Soto, Ace Von Johnson and Gregg Bissonette.

In October 2018, Eric Martin said in interview with Friday NI Rocks that the band is in the process of planning their next album. According to him, once the band is done with its 2019 touring commitments, they will subsequently disband: "Yeah, that's the last hurrah – that's it. It feels a little uncomfortable to keep going without Pat Torpey."

Solo projects: 1998–present

Solo albums
While in Mr. Big, Martin was also involved in other projects on the side. In 1995, Martin was the vocalist in The Power Rangers Orchestra, which also featured Guns N' Roses member Matt Sorum. Their version of "Go Go Power Rangers" was featured in Mighty Morphin Power Rangers: The Movie. Martin's third solo album, Somewhere in the Middle, was written during the two-year hiatus from Mr. Big. The CD was completed in 1998 and released in Japan, Southeast Asia, and Europe. Strong Japanese sales prompted a 1998 tour.

In between promoting and preparing for Mr. Big's 2002 "Farewell Tour", Martin continued to record songs for his fourth solo album. He promised a return to his "rawk roots" and he definitely did so with "I'm Goin' Sane" which was released in Asia, Europe, and the US in late 2002. After the success of a Japan tour, an appearance at the European "Gods Festival", and a 23-city US tour, Martin decided to go back to the studio to record Pure, an EP that covers his hits in an unplugged and stripped-down acoustic form. In 2003, Martin contributed his version of "Cheer Up" to the Japanese release Sincerely 2 – Mariya Takeuchi Song Book album. He also came to attention outside of his priority solo activities, portraying the character "Mr. Niko" for a 2004 "Genius" outing In Search of The Little Prince.

Later on, Martin would record another album entitled Destroy All Monsters, which would then be released in Japan, Europe, the US, and South America in 2004. The album's sound is something Eric calls "distorted pop" with a focus on his rock roots.

Tak Matsumoto Group
Later in 2002, Martin was contacted by Tak Matsumoto. Tak's band, B'z, has sold over 80 million records and held onto success for over 20 years in Japan. Tak decided to put together a rock band called Tak Matsumoto Group, or TMG, with his favorite players; this would include Eric on vocals, Jack Blades (Night Ranger/Damn Yankees) on bass, and Chris Frasier (Steve Vai/Edgar Winter/Eddie Money) on drums, and, of course, himself on guitar. They spent four months writing and recording an album in Los Angeles, did a 10-day promotional tour in Japan, quickly followed by a Platinum album, and a 20-city sold-out tour from July to September, ending at the Budokan. 

TMG was among the top five bands on melodicrock.com during that time, but the band no longer pursued tours beyond Japan.

During the same year TMG was in the works, Eric and Denise were also expecting twin boys by December. In light of this, Eric decided to lie low for the next couple of years.

Work on different projects
From 2004 to 2007, Martin was involved in numerous projects while remaining near home. A more comprehensive collection of his works are available on Eric Martin's Official Site. His projects included singing tracks on albums of different composers/artists, singing for karaoke games, video games, and TV commercials, and joining benefit concerts all year round. Martin wrote and recorded the theme song for the Pride Fighting Championships, which was a major mixed martial arts organization. The song "The Last Man Standing" debuted New Year's Eve 2006 on pay-per-view to millions of viewers.

Martin also wrote and recorded a song for guitar legend Ronnie Montrose's CD, 10x10. He sings along with nine other singers including Sammy Hagar, Edgar Winter, Davey Pattison, and Mark Farner. The 10x10 album sparked interest in Eric's vocal performance and he was asked to sing the classic song "Guitar Man" with Ronnie Montrose, Denny Carmasi, and Ricky Phillips to take to the Sundance Film Festival. Martin also composed and performed a song called "Fly" for the commercial of Asahi Super Dry Beer in Japan. It is accompanied by a music video which is available at Youtube.com

While taking his family on a stroll along the Marin County Fair, Eric was able to watch a performance by the Nelson Brothers and was later introduced to them by a common friend. The Nelson Brothers, Matthew and Gunnar, invited Eric to join them in the new 80s all-star band they were forming called "Scrap Metal". Generally, Scrap Metal would be a band dedicated to performing classic heavy metal and rock 'n' roll hits from the 80s and 90s.

On February 3, 2007, Eric Martin, together with Matthew and Gunnar Nelson of "Nelson", Mark Slaughter of "Slaughter", Jani Lane of "Warrant", and Kelly Keagy of "Night Ranger", performed under the "Scrap Metal" banner for an MTV filmed concert at the Mohegan Sun Hotel & Casino in Uncasville, Connecticut. They would compose the core of the band. A few months later, he made an appearance as a Guest Vocalist of Japanese Jazz Fusion Band T-Square on their album, 33. The song he was featured in is called "Tell the Truth", which is based on T-Square's hit from 1987, "Truth". Scrap Metal would tour around the US all year round. In most performances, they would often have different guests who were likewise players from other 80's bands.

In 2010, Eric participated in a tribute album titled Mister Bolin's Late Night Revival, a compilation of 17 previously unreleased tracks written by guitar legend Tommy Bolin, prior to his death in 1976.  The CD includes other artists such as HiFi Superstar, Doogie White, Troy Luccketta, Jeff Pilson, Randy Jackson, Rachel Barton, Rex Carroll, Derek St. Holmes, Kimberley Dahme, and The 77's.  A percentage of the proceeds from this project will benefit the Jackson Recovery Centers.

In 2013, Martin was invited to be part of the metal opera project Avantasia, by Tobias Sammet. Martin played the role of a beggar on the album The Mystery of Time, performing What's Left of Me, with Sammet. Martin was also part of their 2013 world tour in support of the album as one of the guest vocalists. He is also part of their 2016 world tour in support of the album Ghostlights, notably performing the guest vocal role in the songs "Dying for an Angel", "The Wicked Symphony" and "Twisted Mind".

Mr. Vocalist 1 and 2, solo touring
In early 2008, Martin was approached, again, by Sony Japan to do a project wherein he would cover (translated) famous Japanese Ballads sung by women. The album, entitled Mr. Vocalist, was released in November 2008 and topped the charts of several cities in Japan; it was also the number-one seller in several online record stores. The album would include ballads such as "I Believe" by Ayaka, "Yuki no Hana" by Mika Nakashima, and "M" by Princess Princess.

Seeing the success of Mr. Vocalist, Sony Japan opted to follow it up with another one. Mr. Vocalist 2 was unique from the first because all the songs included in it were famous international ballads, and were voted in by fans either through the Internet or through mobile phone. Martin and Sony Japan lined up about 30 international ballads sung by women, such as "Hero" by Mariah Carey, "My Heart Will Go On" by Celine Dion and "Eternal Flame" by The Bangles. The top 12 songs were taken from the list and were covered by Eric and Sony Japan's team of top musicians. The resulting album was released on March 4, 2009, and topped the charts all over Japan at its debut. For months, it continued to move along the top five albums in Japan.

From 2007 to 2009, Martin toured all over Europe, South America, and India, with different local bands backing him up at each tour.

It all started as an idea a few years before; Eric and Denise were figuring out how to make tours overseas cost effective and fresh per performance. They would call promoters all around the world and book shows 5 months in advance, find the best rock musicians or the most popular bands in the big cities and have them learn 18 to 20 of Eric's tunes, send mp3's back and forth (and pray for the best). Eric performed all over the world with bands such as The Road Vultures from Argentina, Hayseed from Norway, Raw Like Sushi (a Mr. Big tribute band) from Italy, and John McNamara's band from Australia.

Martin was invited by the King of Tripura, Kirit Pradyot Deb Burman, to perform Mr. Big songs during the Rock Festival at Shillong. Shillong is well known in India as a place for avid music-lovers, especially rock. Eric and the band members (the Road Vultures) were graciously treated as state guests and were escorted upon arrival in India and during the concert. Amit Paul, a popular singer from the show "Indian Idol", together with other Indian celebrities, joined the show and sang part of "To Be With You" with Eric. The gig in India was meant to be only a seven-to-ten thousand seat show; but, as people started to break into the barricades, the crowd got larger (to about 20,800 people). 

Martin also toured with Richie Kotzen in South America, a former bandmate from Mr. Big. The two found themselves performing 15,000-seat shows and playing the songs of Mr. Big together again.

On October 10, 2012, Martin released the cover album Mr. Rock Vocalist. It features covers of Japanese songs such as "Alone" by B'z, "Honey" by L'Arc~en~Ciel and "Forever Love" by X Japan, and guest musicians such as Steve Stevens, Marty Friedman and John 5.

Discography

Solo albums
 Eric Martin (1985)
 I'm Only Fooling Myself (1987)
 Somewhere in the Middle (1998)
 I'm Goin' Sane (2002)
 Destroy All Monsters (2004)
 Mr. Vocalist (2008)
 Mr. Vocalist 2 / Timeless (2009)
 Mr. Vocalist X'Mas (2009)
 Mr. Vocalist 3 (2010)
 Mr. Rock Vocalist (2012)

Compilation albums
 Soul Sessions: The Capitol Years (1986)
 Love Is Alive: Works of 1985–2010 (2010)
 Mr. Vocalist Best (2011)

Extended plays
 Pure (2003)

Eric Martin Band
 Sucker for a Pretty Face (1983)

Mr. Big

Tak Matsumoto Group
 "Oh Japan ~Our Time Is Now~" (2004)
 TMG I (2004)

Guest appearances
 Big Trouble – Big Trouble (1987; duet on the track "What About You And Me)
 Michael Bolton – The Hunger (1987)
 Signal – Loud & Clear (1989)
 Todd Rundgren – Nearly Human (1989)
 Europe – Prisoners in Paradise (1991; co-writer of "All or Nothing")
 Laura Branigan – Over My Heart (1993; co-writer of "Over My Heart")
 Sammy Hagar – Marching to Mars (1997)
 Mogg/Way – Edge of the World (1997)
 Lebocat – Flo's Barbershop (2002)
 Harry Hess – Just Another Day (2003)
 Mariya Takeuchi – Sincerely, Vol. 2: Mariya Takeuchi Song Book (2003)
 Various artists – Genius: A Rock Opera, Episode 2: In Search of the Little Prince (2004; as "Mr. Niko")
 Richie Zito's Avalon – Avalon (2006)
 Various artists – Genius: A Rock Opera, Episode 3: The Final Surprise  (2007; as "Mr. Niko")
 Ted Nugent – Love Grenade (2007)
 T-Square – 33 (2007)
 Jun Senoue – The Works (2009)
 Debbie Gibson - Ms. Vocalist (2010)
 Pushking – The World as We Love It (2011)
 Avantasia – The Mystery of Time (2013)
 Mägo de Oz – "Celtic Land" (2013; on the track "Xanandra")
 Avantasia – Ghostlights (Live digibook edition bonus disc) (2016)
 Avantasia – Moonglow (2019)
 Jeff Scott Soto - The Duets Collection, Vol. 1 (2021)

Tribute album appearances
Working Man – A Tribute to Rush (1996)
Siam Shade Tribute (2010)
Mister Bolin's Late Night Revival (2011)
Sin-Atra (2011)
Working Class Dogs: A Tribute to Rick Springfield (2012)
L'Arc-en-Ciel Tribute (2012)

Soundtrack appearances
 Teachers soundtrack (1984) ("I Can't Stop the Fire")
 Iron Eagle soundtrack (1986) ("These Are the Good Times" and "Eyes of the World")
 The Amazing Spider-Man vs. The Kingpin (1993)
 Mighty Morphin Power Rangers soundtrack (1995)
 Mad About You - Music from the Television Series (1997) ("I Love The Way You Love Me")
 Daytona USA Circuit Edition soundtrack (1997)
 Pride Fighting Championships theme song "Last Man Standing" (2006)

References

External links
 
  (Sony Music Entertainment Japan)
 
 

1960 births
Living people
People from Long Island
American male singers
American heavy metal singers
American rock singers
Mr. Big (American band) members
Tak Matsumoto Group members